Robert P. Mahfouz (born October 30, 1959 in Metairie, Louisiana) is a former professional American football player.  Mahfouz became the starting quarterback for the Jacksonville Bulls of the USFL in 1984. He was invited to camp by the New Orleans Saints in 1982, but he did not make the team.

College
Mahfouz played for the LSU Tigers football team from 1979 to 1980.  While playing for LSU Mahfouz had 17 completions on 35 passing attempts for 262 yards.  Mahfouz then transferred to Southeastern Louisiana University, where he is listed historically as #6 overall for passing yards per game (155.2, 1981), #10 overall for average yards per completion (14.5, 1981), #4 Average Yards Per Pass (8.1, 1981), #6 Passing Efficiency (131.3, 1981), #9 Pass Completion Percentage (55.9, 1981), and #6 Total Offense Per Game (162.5, 1981).

Mahfouz was a key member of one of the best comebacks in school history vs rival Northeast Louisiana.  Down 40-21 with 11:34 remaining in the game, Mahfouz threw two touchdown passes to David Peterson and another to Todd Jones that were the highlights of a 29-point fourth quarter that changed the outcome of the game. Mahfouz finished the game with 298 yards and five touchdowns, walking away with the win.

Professional
Robert Mahfouz played for the Jacksonville Bulls in the 1984 and 1985 seasons before he was cut.  He saw most of his playing time during the 1984 season, finishing with 2174 yards, 11 touchdowns and 14 interceptions.  He had 180 completions in 309 passing attempts for a lackluster pass completion ratio of 58.3% in 1984.  The team finished the season 6-12 and in fifth place in the Southern Division.

References

External links 
Robbie Mahfouz on Fanbase

1959 births
Living people
American football quarterbacks
Jacksonville Bulls players
LSU Tigers football players
Players of American football from Louisiana
Southeastern Louisiana Lions football players